The media in New York's Capital District is part of the Albany-Schenectady-Troy media market, which is the 59th largest in the United States, includes all of the 11 counties of the Capital District, along with Hamilton County, New York, as well as Berkshire County, Massachusetts, and Bennington County, Vermont. In total, there are 16 AM/MW stations, 30 full-power FM stations, 14 low-power FM translators, 8 full power analog TV stations, 5 low-power TV translators, and 8 full power digital TV (DTV) stations licensed to communities within 30 miles (48 km) of downtown Albany. In terms of broadcast media, Albany is part of Arbitron market #63 (radio), and Nielsen DMA #57 (television), and is a broadcast market with historical relevance. The pioneering influence of General Electric in Schenectady directly contributed to the area emerging as the birthplace of station-based television (WRGB) and one of the earliest FM broadcast stations (today's WRVE), in addition to the first federally licensed radio station in upstate New York, WGY.

Print

Newspaper

The Albany Times Union is area's primary daily newspaper; its headquarters moved to suburban Colonie from Albany in the 1970s, after a dispute with then-Mayor Erastus Corning 2nd over land needed for expansion. More localized are the Amsterdam Recorder for Montgomery and Fulton County; The Daily Gazette, which focuses primarily on Schenectady; The Daily Mail in Greene County;  the Gloversville Leader-Herald for Fulton County; The Post-Star, which focuses on Washington, Warren, and northern Saratoga counties; the Troy Record, which focuses on Troy; the Register-Star for Columbia County; and The Saratogian, which focuses on Saratoga County.

Weekly
Adirondack Moneysaver - Saratoga County free shopper's guide, with local merchant specials, classifieds, free non-profits
The Business Review - a business weekly published each Friday
Legislative Gazette - covers New York State politics; based in Albany
Metroland - a free alternative / lifestyle newsweekly printed in Albany; publishes on Thursday
Saratoga TODAY Newspaper - free news weekly printed by Saratoga Publishing, published every Friday for Saratoga Springs and surrounding communities
Spotlight Newspapers - local news, events and classifieds printed in several different editions for select suburban towns in the Capital region
Tuesday Edition - family-oriented events in and around the Capital District

Other
Campus publications
Albany Student Press - published by the students of the University at Albany, SUNY
The Chronicle - published by students at The College of Saint Rose; printed by The Daily Gazette; published every Tuesday during the school year

Radio

In 1947, this region was also home to the first independently owned and operated stand-alone FM radio station in the United States, W47A. In the early 2000s, the greater Albany market had the distinction of having the highest concentration of FM broadcast stations east of the Mississippi River. The Capital District has three local News/Talk radio stations, WGY, WROW, and WGDJ on the AM (MW) band. All feature a mixture of locally oriented and nationally syndicated programming. There are two Sports formatted stations: WOFX, local affiliate for Fox Sports Radio; and WTMM, local affiliate for ESPN Radio. Both stations provide local sports and sports-talk programming as well as national content. The FM dial is primarily made up of commercial music-formatted stations similar to those in other cities around North America, the largest of which include Pop music station WFLY 'FLY-92', Adult Contemporary WYJB 'B-95.5', Hot AC WRVE '99.5 The River', Rock station WQBK-FM 'Q-103', Classic Rock WPYX 'PYX-106', and Country music WGNA-FM 'Country 107.7'. Public radio broadcasting is available from two organisations: Northeast Public Radio serves the Capital Region via their flagship station WAMC-FM, and is the primary local affiliate for NPR network programming, and WMHT-FM is another local outlet that clears select NPR and PRI programming. WAMC focuses on News & Talk programming during the day, various music programs and BBC World Service programming in the evening, while WMHT-FM mainly provides Classical Music programming for most of their broadcast schedule. There are no radio stations in the Albany area that provide programming in languages other than English on a full-time basis. A few individual programs in languages including Spanish, Italian and Arabic are scheduled, primarily on college owned and operated stations.

AM stations

FM stations

Fringe FM signals which can be received in the Albany market include:

Television
WRGB has the distinction of being the very first affiliated station of the NBC Television Network. The Albany TV DMA is served by the following stations, providing programming from many of the English-language American broadcast television networks: WRGB (CBS), WTEN (ABC), WNYT (NBC), WXXA (Fox), WMHT (PBS), WCWN (CW), WNYA (MyNetworkTV), and WYPX (ION). There are currently no local affiliates for any of the Spanish-language domestic broadcast television networks, however the national service of Univision is provided via cable TV. Local cable TV operator Charter Communications provides a 24-hour cable news television channel, Spectrum News Capital Region (formerly Capital News 9, YNN Capital Region, and Time Warner Cable News Capital Region; now covering Albany and Glens Falls). Christian television networks TBN and 3ABN are available via low-power translator service to the immediate metro area. Unlike many television markets around the country, TV stations from neighboring markets cannot normally be received in the greater Albany area due to distance and terrain.

Charter Communications also provides a local 24-hour rolling news service to its subscribers, Spectrum News Capital Region (formerly Capital News 9) on cable channel 9.

References

External links
Saint Rose Internet Radio: Internet based radio station for The College of Saint Rose
Albany, NY on American Radio Map (Radiomap.us)

Capital